is a Japanese voice actress from Yamanashi Prefecture. She is employed by the talent management firm I'm Enterprise.

As of June 30, 2016, she has retired from voice acting.

Filmography

Anime 
 Gundam Seed Destiny (2004 TV series), Athrun Zala (child)
 Mahō Sensei Negima! (2004 TV special), Chisame Hasegawa
 Rozen Maiden: Träumend (2005 TV series), Kanaria
 Negima! (2005 TV series), Chisame Hasegawa, Theme Song Performance (OP5, OP8, ED4)
 Mahō Sensei Negima! OVA Haru (2006 OVA), Chisame Hasegawa
 Negima!? (2006 TV series), Chisame Hasegawa, Theme Song Performance (ED9)
 Mahō Sensei Negima! OVA Natsu (2006 OVA), Chisame Hasegawa
 Rozen Maiden: Ouvertüre (2006 TV special), Kanaria
 Mushi-Uta (2007 TV series), Asami Minagawa
 Clannad (2007 TV series), Female student (ep 1), Customer (ep 8), Boy (ep 19)
 Noramimi (2008 TV series), Kamechobi (eps 3, 4, 10)
 Mahō Sensei Negima! ~Shiroki Tsubasa Ala Alba~ (2008 OVA) Chisame Hasegawa
 Clannad After Story (2008 TV series), Student (ep 23)
 Mahō Sensei Negima! ~Mō Hitotsu no Sekai~ (2009 OVA), Chisame Hasegawa, Theme Song Performance
 Cuticle Detective Inaba (2013 TV series), Wakaba Ogino
 Rozen Maiden: Zurückspulen (2013 TV series), Kanaria

Video games 
 Arcana Heart (2005), Saki Tsuzura
Ar tonelico II: Melody of Metafalica (2007), Cocona Bartel
 Arcana Heart 2 (2007), Saki Tsuzura
 Arcana Heart 3 (2009), Saki Tsuzura
 Ar tonelico III: Sekai Shūen no Hikigane wa Shōjo no Uta ga Hajiku (2010) Cocona Bartel
 CR Mahō Sensei Negima! (2017), Chisame Hasegawa

References

External links
Official blog 
Official agency profile 

1978 births
Living people
Voice actresses from Yamanashi Prefecture
Japanese video game actresses
Japanese voice actresses
I'm Enterprise voice actors